The year 1706 in music involved some significant events.

Events
Louis-Antoine Dornel succeeds François d'Agincourt as organist at the church of Sainte-Marie-Madeleine-en-la-Cité.
David Tecchler makes the cello now on loan to Denis Brott from the Canada Council for the Arts Musical Instrument Bank.

Published popular music
Thomas D'Urfey – Wit and Mirth, or Pills to Purge Melancholy, vol. 4 (collection of songs)

Classical music 
Johann Sebastian Bach – Fantasia in C minor, BWV 1121
Francesco Bartolomeo Conti – Il Gioseffo
John Gostling – the "Gostling manuscript", a collection of sixty-four anthems: seventeen by Henry Purcell, twenty-three by John Blow, three by Matthew Locke, four by Pelham Humfrey, four by William Turner, and one by William Child, one by Henry Aldrich, three by Thomas Tudway, four by Jeremiah Clarke, and a few others.
Jean-Adam Guilain – Pièces d'orgue pour le Magnificat sur les huit tons différents de l'église
George Frideric Handel  
Chi rapì la pace al core, HWV 90
Figlio d'alte speranze, HWV 113
Lucrezia, HWV 145
Tu fedel? tu costante?, HWV 171
Udite il mio consiglio, HWV 172
Laudate pueri Dominum, HWV 236
Lesson in A minor, HWV 496
Michele Mascitti – 15 Violin Sonatas, Op.2
James Paisible - The Britannia, Mr. Isaac's new dance, made for Her Majesty's Birth Day...
Maria Pannina – Il trionfo dell'amor santo espresso nella conquista del cuore, a collection of canzonettas for two voices
Michel Pignolet de Montéclair – Cantates à voix seule et avec simfonie
Jean-Philippe Rameau – Premier Livre de Pieces de Clavecin
Jean-Baptiste Stuck – Cantates Françaises et Italiennes
Stanisław Sylwester Szarzyński – Trio Sonata in D major
Giuseppe Valentini – 7 Idee per Camera, Op.4

Opera
Toussaint Bertin de la Doué – Cassandre
Antonio Maria Bononcini – Arminio
Francesco Mancini – Alessandro il Grande in Sidone
Marin Marais – Alcyone
Alessandro Scarlatti  
Il Gran Tamerlano
Lucio Manlio l'imperioso
 Jean-Philippe Rameau – Nélée et Myrthis, RCT 50

Births 
April 6 – Louis de Cahusac, librettist (died 1759)
April 24 – Giovanni Battista Martini, violinist, harpsichordist and composer (died 1784)
October 18 – Baldassare Galuppi, composer best known for his operas (died 1785)
November 7 – Carlo Cecere, composer (died 1761)
December – William Hayes, composer and organist (died 1777)

Deaths 
February – Frances Purcell, widow of Henry Purcell
March 3 – Johann Pachelbel, composer (born 1653)
June 30 – Jacques Boyvin, French organist and composer (born c.1649)
October 26 – Andreas Werckmeister, organist and composer (born 1645)
December 2 – Johann Georg Ahle, organist and composer (born 1651)
date unknown – Flavio Carlo Lanciani, opera composer (born 1667)

References

 
18th century in music
Music by year